Jason Paolo Flores Abrigo (born 28 February 1997) is a Chilean footballer who plays for Curicó Unido.

International career
Along with Chile U20, he won the L'Alcúdia Tournament in 2015.

Personal life
He is the cousin of Joe Abrigo, another professional football player.

Honours
Chile U20
 L'Alcúdia International Tournament (1): 2015

References

External links
 

1997 births
Living people
Footballers from Santiago
Chilean footballers
Chile under-20 international footballers
Chilean Primera División players
Unión Española footballers
C.D. Antofagasta footballers
Curicó Unido footballers
Association football midfielders